Pothyne subfemoralis is a species of beetle in the family Cerambycidae. It was described by Breuning in 1968.

References

subfemoralis
Beetles described in 1968